Scutigeridae is a family of centipedes. It includes most of the species known as house centipedes, including Scutigera coleoptrata and Allothereua maculata.

Genera
These 25 genera belong to the family Scutigeridae:

 Allothereua Verhoeff, 1905 i c g
 Ballonema Verhoeff, 1904 i c g
 Ballonemella Verhoeff, 1944 i c g
 Brasiloscutigera Bücherl, 1939 i c g
 Dendrothereua Verhoeff, 1944 i b
 Diplacrophor Chamberlin, 1920 i c g
 Fulmenocursor Wilson, 2001 g
 Gomphor Chamberlin, 1944 i c g
 Parascutigera Verhoeff, 1904 i c g
 Pesvarus Würmli, 1974 i c g
 Phanothereua Chamberlin, 1958 i c g
 Pilbarascutigera Edgecombe and Barrow, 2007 i
 Podothereua Verhoeff, 1905 i c g
 Prionopodella Verhoeff, 1925 i c g
 Prothereua Verhoeff, 1925 i c g
 Scutigera Lamarck, 1801 i c g b
 Seychellonema Butler, Edgecombe, Ball and Giribet, 2011 i g
 Suctigerina  g
 Tachythereua Verhoeff, 1905 i c g
 Thereulla Chamberlin, 1955 i c g
 Thereuonema Verhoeff, 1904 i c g
 Thereuopoda Verhoeff, 1904 i c g
 Thereuopodina Verhoeff, 1905 i c g
 Thereuoquima Bücherl, 1949 i c g
 Theuronema  g

Data sources: i = ITIS, c = Catalogue of Life, g = GBIF, b = Bugguide.net

The earliest known member of this family is †Fulmenocursor, an extinct genus from the Early Cretaceous of the Crato Formation of Brazil.

References

External links

Centipede families
Scutigeromorpha
Extant Early Cretaceous first appearances